Night Strangler may refer to:

Criminals 
 Richard Ramirez (1960–2013), American serial killer known as the Night Stalker
 Original Night Stalker, Joseph DeAngelo, serial killer and rapist unrelated to Ramírez, also known as the Golden State Killer. 
 Minstead Rapist, an unidentified serial rapist operating in London since 1992, sometimes referred to in the press as the Night Stalker

Other uses 
 The Night Strangler (film), a 1973 TV film starring Darren McGavin

See also
 The Night Stalker (1972 film), the predecessor to The Night Strangler
 Kolchak: The Night Stalker, a 1974 television series based on the movie, starring Darren McGavin
 Night Stalker (TV series), a 2005 remake of the original Kolchak series